, provisional designation , is a background asteroid and binary system from the inner regions of the asteroid belt. It was discovered on 11 October 1985, by astronomer by T. F. Fric and Richard Gilbrech at the Palomar Observatory in California. It is the only minor-planet discovery for these two astronomers. Its 1.2-kilometer sized minor-planet moon was discovered in July 2007 and announced the following month.

Orbit and classification 

 is a non-family asteroid from the main belt's background population when applying the hierarchical clustering method to its proper orbital elements. Based on osculating Keplerian orbital elements, the asteroid has also been classified as a member of the Flora family, a giant asteroid family and the largest family of stony asteroids in the main-belt.

It orbits the Sun in the inner asteroid belt at a distance of 1.7–2.6 AU once every 3 years and 2 months (1,164 days; semi-major axis of 2.17 AU). Its orbit has an eccentricity of 0.19 and an inclination of 4° with respect to the ecliptic.

Numbering and naming 

This minor planet was permanently numbered  by the Minor Planet Center on 17 March 1995. As of 2018, it has not been named.

Physical characteristics 

In the SDSS-based taxonomy,  is an unusual L-type asteroid.

Rotation period 

Lightcurve analysis gave a well-defined rotation period of  hours with a brightness variation of 0.35 magnitude. Several concurring period determinations in the range of 2.7091 to 2.710 hours with an amplitude of 0.26 to 0.36 magnitude were also made between 2007 and 2013.

Satellite 

During a previous photometric observation by David Higgins on 15 July 2007, it was revealed that  is a binary asteroid with a minor-planet moon in its orbit. The discovery was announced on 2 August 2007. The satellite, provisional designation S/2007 (6265) 1, measures approximately 1.16 kilometers. It is separated by 8 km from its primary, orbiting it once every 15 hours and 52 minutes (15.859 hours or 0.6608 days).

Diameter and albedo 

According to the survey carried out by the NEOWISE mission of NASA's Wide-field Infrared Survey Explorer (WISE),  measures between 4.95 and 5.20 kilometers in diameter and its surface has an albedo between 0.285 and 0.287. The Johnston's archive derives a diameter of 4.81 km and 1.16 km for the primary and secondary, respectively, based on an effective WISE-diameter of 4.95 km and using the lower limit of 0.24 for the secondary-to-primary diameter-ratio (Ds/p) determined by David Higgins. Later observation by Higgins and Pravec determined a Ds/p ratio of 0.30 to 0.32, which increases the satellites size by a quarter to a third if all other factors remain unchanged. The Collaborative Asteroid Lightcurve Link assumes a standard albedo for members of the Flora family of 0.24 and calculates a diameter of 5.17 kilometers based on an absolute magnitude of 13.6.

References

External links 
 Asteroids with Satellites, Robert Johnston, johnstonsarchive.net
 Asteroid Lightcurve Database (LCDB), query form (info )
 Dictionary of Minor Planet Names, Google books
 Discovery Circumstances: Numbered Minor Planets (5001)-(10000) – Minor Planet Center
 
 

006265
006265
19851011